Pentagenella is a genus of lichen-forming fungi in the family Opegraphaceae. It contains five species.

Species
Pentagenella corallina 
Pentagenella fragillima 
Pentagenella gracillima 
Pentagenella langei 
Pentagenella ligulata

References

Arthoniomycetes
Arthoniomycetes genera
Lichen genera
Taxa described in 1897
Taxa named by Otto Vernon Darbishire